Steve Nelmark is an American mixed martial artist. He competed in the Heavyweight division.

Mixed martial arts record

|-
| Loss
| align=center| 2–1
| David Abbott
| KO (punch)
| UFC: Ultimate Ultimate 1996
| 
| align=center| 1
| align=center| 1:03
| Birmingham, Alabama, United States
| 
|-
| Win
| align=center| 2–0
| Marcus Bossett
| Submission (choke)
| UFC: Ultimate Ultimate 1996
| 
| align=center| 1
| align=center| 1:37
| Birmingham, Alabama, United States
| 
|-
| Win
| align=center| 1–0
| Tai Bowden
| TKO (doctor stoppage)
| UFC 9: Motor City Madness
| 
| align=center| 1
| align=center| 7:25
| Detroit, Michigan, United States
|

See also
List of male mixed martial artists

References

External links
 
 
 Steve Nelmark at mixedmartialarts.com

American male mixed martial artists
Heavyweight mixed martial artists
Living people
Year of birth missing (living people)
Ultimate Fighting Championship male fighters